Enable Software, Inc. was a privately held software development company located in Ballston Lake, New York. Enable was founded in 1984 by Ron Quake and Bob Hamilton.

The company's flagship product, called Enable was an integrated office suite for IBM PC compatibles. The suite included a word processor, a 3D spreadsheet, a relational database, and integrated communications. In 1992 Enable Office added electronic mail, and calendaring software. At that time, the company estimated it had more than one million users of its products. Enable 4.5 was released in April 1992, with support for OS/2 2.0. In 1993 it introduced JetForm for Enable, "a mail-enabled forms designer for Microsoft Windows."

Another Product of Enable, PowerLine, was a multi-protocol terminal client for Windows similar to Hyperterminal released in 1993.

Enable ceased operations in 1997. At that time, there were an estimated 190,000 active users of Enable products.

References

External links
 Review of Enable O/A 4.0

Defunct software companies of the United States
Software companies based in New York (state)
Software companies established in 1984
1984 establishments in New York (state)
Defunct companies based in New York (state)